Anna Berger (July 26, 1922 – May 26, 2014) was an American character actress in film and television, who specialized in playing frazzled housewives and matriarchs.

Early life and education
Anna Berger was born on July 26, 1922, in Manhattan, the third of eight children of William and Bella (Heller) Berger. She grew up on the Lower East Side and began acting as a child. After graduating from Seward Park High School, she studied acting in 1948.

Career 
She appeared in such films as Woody Allen's Crimes and Misdemeanors (1989) and the Adam Sandler vehicle You Don't Mess with the Zohan (2008), and on such television series as Law & Order: Criminal Intent, Everybody Loves Raymond and NYPD Blue. She also acted on The Goldbergs.

On Broadway, Berger appeared in Unlikely Heroes (1971), The Rose Tattoo  (1966), Gideon (1961), and Twilight Walk (1951).

In the early-1960s, Berger was the New York City Board of Education's drama specialist for community center programs.

Death
Berger was married to Robert Malatzky, and they had two daughters. Berger died on May 26, 2014, aged 91, in Manhattan.

Filmography

Film

Television

References

External links

1922 births
2014 deaths
20th-century American actresses
21st-century American actresses
Actresses from New York City
American child actresses
American film actresses
American television actresses
People from the Lower East Side
Seward Park High School alumni